The Lower Windy Creek Ranger Cabin No. 15, also known as Lower Windy Creek Patrol Cabin and Lower Windy Shelter Cabin, is a historic backcountry shelter in the Denali National Park & Preserve, in Alaska. It is built out of peeled logs, sealed with oakum and concrete chinking. It has a medium-pitch gable roof of corrugated metal and shiplap. The cabin is located about 500 feet east of Mile 324 on the Alaska Railroad.

It is a standard design by the National Park Service and was built in 1932. Shortly after its construction, a complex of separate log dog kennels, a log cache and an outhouse were added, also to a standard Park Service design.

The cabin was listed on the National Register of Historic Places in 1986.

References

Buildings and structures in Denali Borough, Alaska
Ranger stations in Denali National Park and Preserve
Park buildings and structures on the National Register of Historic Places in Alaska
Log cabins in the United States
Rustic architecture in Alaska
National Register of Historic Places in Denali National Park and Preserve
Log buildings and structures on the National Register of Historic Places in Alaska
1932 establishments in Alaska
Buildings and structures on the National Register of Historic Places in Denali Borough, Alaska
National Park Service Rustic architecture